Below is the list of asteroid close approaches to Earth in 2008. 2008 was the first year that an asteroid was successfully detected before it impacted earth ( was the first successfully predicted asteroid impact).

Timeline of close approaches less than one lunar distance from Earth in 2008 
A list of known near-Earth asteroid close approaches less than 1 lunar distance (384,400 km or 0.00256 AU) from Earth in 2008.

 

 

 

 

 

Warning Times by Size 
This sub-section visualises the warning times of the close approaches listed in the above table, depending on the size of the asteroid. The sizes of the charts show the relative sizes of the asteroids to scale. For comparison, the approximate size of a person is also shown. This is based the absolute magnitude of each asteroid, an approximate measure of size based on brightness.

Abs Magnitude 30 and greater
 (size of a person for comparison)

Abs Magnitude 29-30

Absolute Magnitude 28-29

Absolute Magnitude 27-28

Absolute Magnitude 26-27

Absolute Magnitude less than 25 (largest)

Notes

Additional examples
An example list of near-Earth asteroids that passed more than 1 lunar distance (384,400 km or 0.00256 AU) from Earth in 2008.
 (~250 meters in diameter) passed 1.44 LD (554,000 km) from Earth on January 29, 2008.
 (~18 meters in diameter) passed between 0.9997 and 1.0023 LD (384,300 to 385,300 km) from Earth on February 6, 2008.
 (~650 meters in diameter) passed 5.9 LD (2.3 million km) from Earth on July 14, 2008.
2008 XK (~12 meters in diameter) may have passed as close as 0.23 LD (89,300 km) from Earth on December 5, 2008, but the nominal orbit suggests it passed nearer to 1.46 LD (560,500 km) from Earth instead.

See also 
List of asteroid close approaches to Earth
List of asteroid close approaches to Earth in 2000-2007
List of asteroid close approaches to Earth in 2009

References